Oganessian (and similar transliterations) a variant of Hovhannisyan is a surname of Armenian origin derived from the Armenian given name Ohannes. People with such names include:

 Alina Oganesyan (born 2004), German rhythmic gymnast 
 Armen Oganesyan (born 1954), CEO of Russian state radio station Voice of Russia
 Gaguik Oganessian (1947-2015), Armenian chess player, writer and organiser
 Khoren Oganesian (born 1955), Soviet footballer
 Yuri Oganessian (born 1933), Russian-Armenian nuclear physicist (the element oganesson is named to honor him)
Marina E. Oganesian (born 1954) Armenian botanist

See also
 Hovhannisyan, a surname
 

Armenian-language surnames

hy:Հովհաննիսյան (այլ կիրառումներ)